Daniel O'Brien, 4th Viscount Clare (died 1693) was the son of Daniel O'Brien, 3rd Viscount Clare and Philadelphia Lennard. A Jacobite supporter of James II, he served with the Irish Army during the War of the Two Kings. He was commander of a regiment which he conveyed to France where he fought in the Battle of Marsaglia on 4 October 1693 and was mortally wounded. Daniel O'Brien never married and was therefore succeeded by his brother Charles O'Brien, 5th Viscount Clare.

17th-century births
1693 deaths
Viscounts in the Peerage of Ireland
Daniel
Irish soldiers in the French Army
People from County Clare
17th-century Irish people